Batkachny Island is an island in the Caspian Sea. It is located right off the mouths of the Volga in an area where there are many delta islands.

Batkachny Island has a very twisted shape, with many headlands and inlets. It is separated from the coast by a 1 km wide channel. It has a length of almost 30 km and a maximum width of 10 km.

Adjacent Islands
Sedmoy Island (Ostrov Sed'moy)  lies about 7 km to the NE.
Nizhny Island (Ostrov Nizhny), also known as 'Nizhny Oseredok'  lies right east of Batkachny Island's eastern coast, separated from it by a channel that has an average width of 1 km.
Maly Setnoy Island (Ostrov Malyy Setnoy) lies 10 km to the east of Batkachny.
Morskoy Setnoy Island (Ostrov Morskoy Setnoy) lies 15 km to the east, beyond Malyy Setnoy.
Other nearby islands include Ostrov Zelenen'ky and Ostrov Zelyony

Administratively Batkachny and its neighboring islands belong to the Astrakhan Oblast of the Russian Federation.

References

External links
Caspian Sea Biodiversity Project

Islands of Astrakhan Oblast
Islands of the Caspian Sea